The following are the national records in Olympic weightlifting in Spain. Records are maintained in each weight class for the snatch lift, clean and jerk lift, and the total for both lifts by the Spanish Weightlifting Federation (Federación Española de Halterofilia).

Current records
Key to tables:

Men

Women

Historical records

Men (1998–2018)

Women (1998–2018)

References
General
Spanish Weightlifting Records – Men 26 November 2022 updated
Spanish Weightlifting Records – Women 26 November 2022 updated
Specific

External links
Spanish Weightlifting Federation web site

Spain
records
Olympic weightlifting
weightlifting